Dialog was a microcomputer system developed by Gorenje in 1980s. It was based on the 8-bit 4 MHz Zilog Z-80A microprocessor. The primary operating system was FEDOS (CP/M 2.2 compatible), developed by Computer Structures and Systems Laboratory (Faculty of Electrical Engineering, University of Ljubljana) and Gorenje. 

There were 3 variants of the Dialog microcomputer system, distinguished only by minor changed: home, laboratory and personal (PC) (in Slovene: hišni, laboratorijski, osebni).  Three types of external memory can be connected with Dialog: cassette recorder, floppy drive (5,25" and 8") and hard drive. The home variant of Dialog used resident FEBASIC (a variant of BASIC).

References

 Mikroračunalnik DIALOG, Tehnično navodilo-uporaba, Gorenje procesna oprema.
 FEBASIC, priročnik za uporabnike sistema DIALOG, T. Žitko, Ljubljana, 1985.

Microcomputers
Gorenje